Thousand Islands is a group of small islands south of Edgeøya. They form part of the Svalbard archipelago. The group consists of over forty islands and islets, including Brotskjer, Kulstadholmane, Utsira, Tufsen, Kong Ludvigøyane, Bölscheøya, Hornøya, Tiholmane, Meinickeøyane, Sletteøya, Schareholmane, Skråholmen, Brækmoholmane, Tareloppa, Vindholmen, and Menkeøyane.

History

The Dutchman Joris Carolus was the first to distinctly mark a group of small islands south of Edgeøya. The Muscovy Company's map (1625) showed a vague mass of islands as well, some labeled, such as Wester I., Beare Iland, Heling I., and the Hopeless Iles. (perhaps Kong Ludvigøyane). The cartographers Gerard Valck and Peter Schenk the Elder were the first to place a "great vague mass of islands stretching round the coast" south of Edgeøya. William Scoresby (1820) is thought to have been the first to label them with the popular name of Thousand Islands, the name they retain to this day.

References

Related reading
 Conway, W. M. (1906) No Man’s Land: A History of Spitsbergen from Its Discovery in 1596 to the Beginning of the Scientific Exploration of the Country (Cambridge University Press) 
Purchas, S. (1625) Hakluytus Posthumus or Purchas His Pilgrimes: Contayning a History of the World in Sea Voyages and Lande Travells by Englishmen and others. Volumes XIII and XIV (Reprint 1906 J. Maclehose and sons).

External links
 Place Names of Svalbard Database Norwegian Polar Institute 

Islands of Svalbard